Baicalein 7-O-glucuronosyltransferase (UBGAT) is an enzyme with systematic name UDP-D-glucuronate:5,6,7-trihydroxyflavone 7-O-glucuronosyltransferase . This enzyme catalyses the following chemical reaction

 UDP-D-glucuronate + baicalein  UDP + baicalin

The enzyme is specific for UDP-D-glucuronate as a sugar donor.

References

External links 
 

EC 2.4.1